Radio Novi Grad or Радио Нови Град is a Bosnian local public radio station, broadcasting from Bosanski Novi/Novi Grad, Bosnia and Herzegovina.

History
It was launched on 27 December 1968 as Radio Bosanski Novi by the municipal council of Bosanski Novi. In Yugoslavia and in SR Bosnia and Herzegovina, it was part of local/municipal Radio Sarajevo network affiliate. This radio station broadcasts a variety of programs such as local news, music, sport and talk shows. Nowadays, program is mainly produced in Serbian.

During the war in Bosnia and Herzegovina, this radio station, which was until 1990 among the best local stations in BiH, was used for propaganda and the spread of national and religious hatred. In order to distance the town from its Bosnian history and its cultural roots and in tune with the war politics, the local Serb government and the population renamed the town “Novi Grad”, a change criticized by Croat and Bosniak residents.

Frequencies 
Estimated number of listeners of Radio Novi Grad is around 13.956. Radiostation is also available in Una-Sana Canton and neighboring Croatia.

 Bosanski Novi/Novi Grad

See also 
List of radio stations in Bosnia and Herzegovina

References

External links 
 www.radionovigrad.com
 www.fmscan.org
 Communications Regulatory Agency of Bosnia and Herzegovina

Bosanski Novi
Novi Grad
Radio stations established in 1968